Piotr Grzelczak (born 2 March 1988, in Łódź) is a Polish footballer who plays as a forward for Kazakhstan side Atyrau. Besides Poland, he has played in Greece and Kazakhstan.

Career

Club
On 30 July 2013, his team Lechia Gdańsk played  in a friendly game against FC Barcelona. Grzelczak scored a goal in the eventual 2-2 draw against the Spanish giants.

On 23 August 2019, FC Atyrau announced the signing of Grzelczak.

Career statistics

Club

1 Including Ekstraklasa Cup.

References

External links
 
 

1988 births
Living people
Footballers from Łódź
Polish footballers
Association football forwards
Widzew Łódź players
Lechia Gdańsk players
Polonia Warsaw players
Jagiellonia Białystok players
Górnik Łęczna players
Platanias F.C. players
Ekstraklasa players
Super League Greece players
Kazakhstan Premier League players
Expatriate footballers in Greece
Polish expatriates in Greece
Chojniczanka Chojnice players
FC Atyrau players
Expatriate footballers in Kazakhstan
Polish expatriate sportspeople in Kazakhstan